Nematobola is a genus of moths of the family Yponomeutidae.

Species
Nematobola candescens - Meyrick, 1892 
Nematobola isorista - Meyrick, 1892 
Nematobola orthotricha - Meyrick, 1892 

Yponomeutidae